Ferdinand Alphonse Fortunat Larose (April 1, 1888 - January 29, 1955) was a French Canadian agronomist, best known for having created in Ontario one of the largest regeneration forests in the 1920s, named after him.

Biography 
Born in Sarsfield, Ontario, Larose studied at the University of Ottawa, where he obtained his diplomas B.A. in 1910 and B.Ph. in 1912 and L.Ph. (Philosophy). He later studied at the Agricultural Institute of Oka (CAE), graduating in Agronomic Sciences in 1919. The same year he became employed in the service of the Ontario Department of Agriculture.

Having established an office in Plantagenet, in the United Counties of Prescott and Russell, he started an inventory of agricultural lands. Discovering that the area around Bourget was a desert of abandoned sandy soil farmland and presented signs of erosion yielding to the advance of the "Bourget Desert", he suggested reforesting this "Bourget Desert" and launched a plan to sow a forest.
Ferdinand Larose had set up a small-scale reforestation experiment with seeds and planting trees in 1921-1923 (the Plantagent Demonstration Woodlot),. In 1926 he started a wasteland utilization campaign in Prescott and Russell counties.

In 1927 he became secretary of the newly founded Committee of Conservation and Reforestation of the united counties. In 1928 he obtained permission to work on a large-scale reforestation. For this, in 1928, the United Counties of Prescott and Russell acquired, on Larose's insistence, the territory of the future forest. This Prescot and Russel County forest, later called Larose Forest, became one of the largest man and hand planted forest in Canada. It covers an area of 110 square km in Clarence-Rockland, The Nation, Alfred and Plantagenet and Russell territories. Ferdinand Larose was then nicknamed The Man Who Planted Trees, after the short novel by French nature writer Jean Giono.
He continued stimulating the selling of abandoned farms by the united counties for further reforestation. He also organised in the late 1930s forest visiting tours to convince politicians to invest in better reforestation. As a result, he could speed up reforestation to about 1 million trees planted annually at the end of the 1940s, early 1950s.

Larose was largely involved in organising farmers and was one of the founders of the Union des cultivateurs franco-ontariens in 1929. Larose also contributed to agricultural education by the creation of agricultural school-clubs for boys and girls in 1935 in each parish of the united Counties.

He also fought for teaching in French, and gave agricultural courses in French, in Kent and Essex counties (1934). At his request, circles of French women farmers were created in those counties in 1936. With the support of Antonin Lalonde, president of the Catholic Union of the Franco-Ontarian farmers, Larose also obtained sewing and cooking education in French for the farmers' wives.

Larose retired in 1950 and was succeeded by Lawrence Faber. He died January 29, 1955, in Montreal at age 66 and is buried in the Plantagenet cemetery.

Honours 

In 1988, the Franco-Ontarian Agricultural Merit was awarded for the first time. The first two winners were Larose and Antonin Lalonde (1911-1985), both posthumously.

In 2004, the Ferdinand Larose Environmental Prize was established in his honor by the French Canadian Association of Ontario and Prescott Russell. The prize was awarded for the first time in 2007, posthumously, to Ernest Hurtubise, of Bourget, the spiritual son of Larose . Gilles Trahan, (Hawkesbury educator), was the 2008 winner and in 2014, the family business Legault Les Serres .

Larose Forest 

As of 2016, the 10,700 hectare forest, originally a man-made conifer plantation, is now a mature mixed forest with a diversity of trees including maples, wild flowers, insects and many species of birds and other animals, including mooses. "Three generations of forest workers have successively planted trees and maintained the forest. In all, more than 18 million trees have been planted".

Publication 
 Ferdinand Larose, The south Nation and its environment in: Conservation in Eastern Ontario, 1947.

References 
 John Bacher, Ferdinand Larose - Key Architect of Ecological Resurrection of Eastern Ontario,  in: Forestory, Newsletter of the Forest History Society Ontario,  Volume 2, nr 2, automne 2011 .

External links
The Larose Forest: History and Ecology, Christine Hanrahan, The Ottawa Field-Naturalists' Club.

Canadian agronomists
Canadian foresters
Green thinkers
1888 births
1955 deaths
People from Ottawa
University of Ottawa alumni
Burials in Ontario